The Revelations Cup is an international association football tournament organized by Mexican Football Federation (FMF) for men's under-20 national teams. The inaugural tournament took place in November 2021 in Guanajuato, Mexico.

Locations

Format

Four U-20 teams—Mexico, the United States, Brazil, and Colombia—were announced as participants for the inaugural edition of the tournament in 2021. They played against each other in a round-robin format for a total of 3 matches per team. The team with the most points were declared winners.

Tiebreakers:
Greater goal difference
Highest number of goals scored
Highest number of points between tied teams

Tournaments
All times are local, CST (UTC–6).

2021 Revelations Cup

Goalscorers

2022 Revelations Cup

Goalscorers

References

External links

International association football competitions hosted by Mexico
2021 in youth association football